Tzelafon is a moshav in central Israel. Located to the north of Beit Shemesh, it falls under the jurisdiction of Mateh Yehuda Regional Council.

History
The village was established in 1950 by immigrants from Yemen on the land of the  depopulated Palestinian village of Bayt Jiz. They were later joined by more immigrants from Morocco, who arrived in Israel in 1955. It was possibly named after the ancient city of Tzelafon (which was located in the area and named after Zelelponith) or for the capparis (Hebrew: Tzalaf) bushes in the area.

References

Moshavim
Populated places established in 1950
Populated places in Jerusalem District
Yemeni-Jewish culture in Israel
1950 establishments in Israel
Moroccan-Jewish culture in Israel